State Route 165 (SR 165) is a primary state highway in the U.S. state of Virginia. The state highway runs  from U.S. Route 17 Business (US 17 Business) in Chesapeake north to SR 337 in Norfolk. SR 165 is a C-shaped route that connects Chesapeake and Norfolk in the Hampton Roads metropolitan area indirectly via Virginia Beach. The highway's east–west segment connects the Chesapeake communities of Deep Creek and Great Bridge with the Princess Anne part of Virginia Beach. SR 165's northwest–southeast portion connects the Princess Anne area with Virginia Beach's Salem and Kempsville communities and with Norfolk. Within Norfolk, the state highway parallels Interstate 64 (I-64) while passing through the eastern and northern areas of the city near Norfolk International Airport and Naval Station Norfolk. Much of SR 165 is a multi-lane divided highway, but there are significant two-lane stretches in all three of the independent cities the highway serves.

Route description

Chesapeake and Virginia Beach
SR 165 begins at an intersection with US 17 Business (George Washington Highway) next to the business route's crossing of the Dismal Swamp Canal in the Deep Creek section of the independent city of Chesapeake. The state highway heads east as Moses Grandy Trail, which begins as a two-lane undivided road but expands to a four-lane divided highway one block east of US 17 Business. SR 165 heads east through a forested area and crosses New Mill Creek before intersecting the eastern end of its old alignment, Cedar Road. The state highway's name changes to Cedar Road at its intersection with US 17 (Dominion Boulevard). SR 165 continues east through a densely populated suburban area toward the Great Bridge area of Chesapeake. Just west of the Chesapeake municipal complex, the state highway reduces to three lanes—two lanes heading east and one lane toward the west—for the last segment of the highway east to SR 168 Business (Battlefield Boulevard), a five-lane road with center turn lane.

After a short concurrency with SR 168 Business, SR 165 turns east onto Mt. Pleasant Road, which is a four-lane divided highway until just east of its partial cloverleaf interchange with SR 168 (Great Bridge Bypass). The state highway reduces to two lanes and crosses a creek and has a grade crossing of the Chesapeake and Albemarle Railroad. East of Centerville Turnpike, SR 165 enters a rural area in which it passes to the north of Naval Auxiliary Landing Field Fentress. The state highway curves north through a swamp, within which the highway enters the city of Virginia Beach by crossing the Chesapeake and Albemarle Canal at its eastern end at the North Landing River. SR 165 heads northeast through farmland to the Virginia Beach municipal center in the Princess Anne area of Virginia Beach, within which the highway meets the western end of SR 149 (Princess Anne Road), which heads northeast toward the Virginia Beach Oceanfront.

SR 165 continues northwest on two-lane Princess Anne Road through a rural area. The state highway enters a suburban area with scattered farmland and expands to an eight-lane divided highway just east of Dam Neck Road, which leads to the Virginia Beach Sportsplex and Veterans United Home Loans Amphitheater. SR 165 continues past the Virginia Beach campus of Tidewater Community College and passes through the Salem area of the city, where the highway intersects Independence Boulevard and Lynnhaven Parkway. A short distance west of Lynnhaven Parkway, two lanes in each direction split off to the west as Ferrell Parkway at a partial interchange; the missing movements are made via Salem Road. SR 165 continues northwest as a four-lane divided highway to the Kempsville are of Virginia Beach. There, the state highway intersects SR 190, which heads south as Kempsville Road and north as Witchduck Road.

Norfolk
SR 165 crosses the upper reaches of the Eastern Branch Elizabeth River before entering the city of Norfolk at its intersection with SR 403 (Newtown Road), which connects SR 165 with I-64 (Hampton Roads Beltway) and I-264 (Virginia Beach Expressway) and provides access to the Newtown Road station of Hampton Roads Transit's Tide Light Rail. The state highway continues north as Kempsville Road, which passes under I-264 just east of its interchange with I-64. SR 165 reduces to two lanes between its intersection with US 58 (Virginia Beach Boulevard) and its underpass of I-64. SR 165 crosses Lake Taylor and turns west onto six-lane Northampton Boulevard for a brief concurrency with US 13 and SR 166. At the next intersection with Military Highway, SR 166 continues west as Princess Anne Road toward Downtown Norfolk, US 13 turns south onto Military Highway toward Chesapeake, and SR 165 turns north onto Military Highway toward Naval Station Norfolk.

SR 165 has a grade crossing of a rail line just south of another underpass of I-64 and intersection with Robin Hood Road, where the highway becomes a five-lane road with a center left-turn lane. Robin Hood Road is used for ramps with westbound I-64; there is also a direct ramp from eastbound I-64 to southbound SR 165 and a ramp from eastbound I-64 to Robin Hood Road.  Robin Hood Road and the next two major streets SR 165 intersects, SR 192 (Azalea Garden Road) and SR 247 (Norview Avenue), are used to reach Norfolk International Airport to the east. North of the airport area, SR 165 follows Military Highway to its conclusion at SR 170 (Little Creek Road). SR 170 heads east toward Naval Amphibious Base Little Creek; SR 165 turns west onto Little Creek Road, another five-lane road. Just to the west, the state highway intersects SR 194 (Chesapeake Boulevard).

SR 165 becomes a divided highway again at Sewells Point Road, just east of its single-point urban interchange with SR 168 (Tidewater Drive). In the Wards Corner area of Norfolk, the state highway has a partial interchange with I-64 that allows access to points to and from the direction of Virginia Beach. SR 165 becomes a four-lane undivided highway at its grade crossing of Norfolk Southern Railway's rail line to Sewell's Point. West of the rail crossing, the state highway intersects US 460 (Granby Street), which to the north provides access to westbound I-64 and I-564 (Admiral Taussig Boulevard), the main highway onto Naval Station Norfolk. SR 165 continues west through a densely populated residential area to its northern terminus at SR 337 (Hampton Boulevard) south of Naval Station Norfolk and Norfolk International Terminal.

Major intersections

References

External links

Virginia Highways Project: VA 165

165
State Route 165
State Route 165
State Route 165